Pankaj Debnath (born 25 September 1966)  is a Bangladesh Awami League politician and the incumbent Jatiya Sangsad member representing  the Barisal-4 constituency.

Career
Nath was elected to the parliament from Barisal-4 in 2014 as a candidate of Bangladesh Awami League. He owns Bihanga Paribahan, a bus transport company, which was founded in 2009. He served as the General Secretary of Awami Swechchhashebok League.

In September 2022, he was dismissed from all party positions, including of the member of the advisory council for violating the party discipline.

References

Living people
1966 births
Awami League politicians
10th Jatiya Sangsad members
11th Jatiya Sangsad members